Alyaksandr Rychardavich Sulima (born 1 August 1979) is a football coach and former player (goalkeeper) from Belarus. He is of Polish descent and can speak the language.

Career
Born in Grodno, Sulima has played professional football in the Belarusian Premier League with FC Neman Grodno, FC MTZ-RIPO Minsk and FC Dinamo Minsk. He also had a brief spell in the Russian First Division with FC Lada Togliatti.

Sulima made his debut for the senior Belarus national football team in a friendly against Romania on 19 February 2004.

In June 2019, Sulima was appointed as goalkeeper coach for the national team of Belarus under newly hired manager Mikhail Markhel.

Honours
MTZ-RIPO Minsk
Belarusian Cup winner: 2004–05, 2007–08

References

External links

1979 births
Living people
Belarusian footballers
Belarus international footballers
FC Lada-Tolyatti players
FC Partizan Minsk players
Association football goalkeepers
FC Neman Grodno players
FC Dinamo Minsk players